Noah Atubolu (born 25 May 2002) is a German professional footballer who plays as a goalkeeper for Bundesliga club SC Freiburg and their 3. Liga reserve squad SC Freiburg II.

International career
Born in Germany, Atubolu is of Nigerian descent. He has represented Germany at youth international level.

Career statistics

Club

Honours
Individual
Fritz Walter Medal U19 Bronze: 2021

References

2002 births
Living people
Sportspeople from Freiburg im Breisgau
German sportspeople of Nigerian descent
German footballers
Footballers from Baden-Württemberg
Association football goalkeepers
Germany under-21 international footballers
Germany youth international footballers
3. Liga players
Regionalliga players
SC Freiburg players
SC Freiburg II players
21st-century German people